Long Lake may refer to:

Cities, towns, places

Canada

Long Lake, Alberta, hamlet
Long Lake (oil sands), an oil sands upgrader project in Alberta
Long Lake Provincial Park (Alberta)
Long Lake Provincial Park (Nova Scotia)
Long Lake, Frontenac County, Ontario, a community
Long Lake, Thunder Bay District, Ontario, a first nations community
Long Lake (electoral district), Saskatchewan

United States
Long Lake, Illinois
Long Lake, Grand Traverse County, Michigan
Long Lake, Iosco County, Michigan
Long Lake, Minnesota
Long Lake, New York, a town in Hamilton County
Long Lake (CDP), New York, a census-designated place in the town
Long Lake, South Dakota
Long Lake, Florence County, Wisconsin, a town
Long Lake (community), Florence County, Wisconsin, an unincorporated community in the town
Long Lake, Washburn County, Wisconsin, a town
Long Lake Township, Michigan
Long Lake Township, Crow Wing County, Minnesota
Long Lake Township, Watonwan County, Minnesota

Lakes

Canada
Long Lake (Athabasca County), Alberta
Long Lake (Thorhild County), Alberta
Long Lake (British Columbia), several lakes, including:
Long Lake (Smith Inlet)
Long Lake (Vancouver Island)
Long Lake (Nova Scotia), several lakes
Long Lake (Ontario), several lakes, including:
Long Lake (East Ferris, Ontario)
Long Lake (Kearney, Nipissing District, Ontario)
Long Lake (Lanark County)
Long Lake (Sharpe Township, Ontario)
 Long Lake, near Yellowknife, Northwest Territories, site of Fred Henne Territorial Park
Long Lake (Saint-Alban), a tributary of the Noire River in Saint-Alban, Quebec
Last Mountain Lake, Saskatchewan, also known as Long Lake

United States
Long Lake (Arizona)
Long Lake (Arkansas County, Arkansas), a lake in Arkansas County, Arkansas
Long Lake (Calhoun County, Arkansas), a lake in Calhoun County, Arkansas
Long Lake (Chicot County, Arkansas), a lake in Chicot County, Arkansas
Long Lake (Clay County, Arkansas), a lake in Clay County, Arkansas
Long Lake (Crittenden County, Arkansas), a lake in Crittenden County, Arkansas
Long Lake (Dallas County, Arkansas), a lake in Dallas County, Arkansas
Long Lake (Desha County, Arkansas), a lake in Desha County, Arkansas
Long Lake (Independence County, Arkansas), a lake in Independence County, Arkansas
Long Lake (Jefferson County, Arkansas), a lake in Jefferson County, Arkansas

Long Lake (Illinois), a Superfund sites in Lake County, Illinois
Long Lake (Indiana)
Long Lake (Maine), in southern Maine
Long Lake (Fish River), in northern Maine's Fish River chain of Lakes
Long Lake (Michigan), index list
Long Lake (Grant County, Minnesota)
 Long Lake in Beaverhead County, Montana
 Long Lake in Sheridan County, Montana
 Long Lake in Toole County, Montana

Long Lake (Codington County, South Dakota)
Long Lake (Jerauld County, South Dakota)
Long Lake (Lake County, South Dakota)
Long Lake (Marshall County, South Dakota)
Long Lake (McPherson County, South Dakota)
Long Lake (Kitsap County, Washington)
Long Lake (Thurston County, Washington)

Long Lake (Wisconsin), a lake in Florence and Forest counties
Long Lake Recreation Area, a lake and associated state park in Fond du Lac County, Wisconsin
John D. Long Lake in South Carolina

Fictional places
Long Lake (Middle-earth), a lake south of the Lonely Mountain in J. R. R. Tolkien's fictional world of Middle-earth

See also

Rural Municipality of Longlaketon No. 219, Saskatchewan, Canada
Lake Rotoroa (disambiguation) (Maori: "long lake"), various New Zealand lakes
Long's Lake, Texas, artificial lake built by Benjamin Long